Thomas "Tom" McNulty (30 December 1929 – April 1979) was an English football player. He was born in Salford, Greater Manchester.

McNulty started his senior career with Manchester United in 1949 and made his debut with the senior team in a home fixture against Portsmouth on 15 April 1950. He helped United win the 1951–52 league championship. He left the club for Liverpool in 1954 for a transfer fee of £7,000 after having made 59 appearances in seven years for United.

Honours
Manchester United
 First Division: 1951–52

References

External links
 Tom McNulty at LFChistory.net
 

1929 births
1979 deaths
English footballers
Manchester United F.C. players
Liverpool F.C. players
Footballers from Salford
Place of death missing
English Football League players
Association football defenders